The Diocese of Lafayette in Indiana is a Latin Church ecclesiastical territory or diocese of the Catholic Church in central Indiana. Bishop William Leo Higi presided over the diocese  from June 6, 1984, until March 12, 2010, when the Holy See announced his successor, Timothy L. Doherty, then a priest of the Diocese of Rockford.  Doherty was consecrated bishop of the diocese on July 15, 2010, and has presided over it since, becoming its sixth ordinary. The Diocese of Lafayette in Indiana is a suffragan diocese in the ecclesiastical province of the metropolitan Archdiocese of Indianapolis.

History

Missionaries and Diocese of Vincennes
The Roman Catholic Church in Indiana began with the Diocese of Vincennes which was created in 1834 by Pope Gregory XVI. It was in this diocese that many French missionaries came to this very anti-Catholic area. The most notable of these missionaries was Theodore Guerin who made her way to southern Indiana with her Sisters of Providence in 1841. Guerin and others in the Sisters formed St. Mary of the Woods College at Terre Haute, Indiana with many alumni throughout the state to preach and spread the Church. From the 1840s to the early 20th century many different parishes were built throughout the area along with Catholic schools which not only broadened the spread of Catholicism, but also created the need for a new diocese. In the late 19th century, the Holy See formed the Diocese of Fort Wayne, separate from the Diocese of Vincennes. The area that was to eventually become Lafayette was at that time part of this new See added to Indiana.

Formation of the Lafayette dioceses
After many years in the Vincennes dioceses, and later in the Diocese of Fort Wayne, the area of north central began to grow in Catholicism and it became apparent that a new diocese was to be formed. The Diocese of Lafayette in Indiana was established by Pope Pius XII on October 21, 1944, from the territory of the Diocese of Fort Wayne. At that time, there were 54 parishes. The diocese contained approximately 31,700 Catholics at its inception. On January 18, 1945, Bishop John George Bennett was consecrated the first bishop of the newly formed Diocese of Lafayette. Bishop Bennett encouraged Catholics of the area to go out and actively help to develop this new diocese. In 1957, Bishop Bennett died while still serving as Bishop of Lafayette. It was announced before his death, while he was ill, that the successor to Bennett would be Bishop John Joseph Carberry.

Bishop Carberry continued the work of his predecessor in the growth of the diocese, while maintaining his own style of leadership. On March 15, 1964, Bishop Carberry announced that a census would be held on November 15. The census found that the diocese had 73,822 Catholics and signified a move from mostly rural populations to scattered suburban areas. On January 20, 1965, it was announced that Bishop Carberry would be transferred to the Diocese of Columbus (later on, Bishop Carberry would be Archbishop of St. Louis and be appointed a Cardinal).

Continued growth
In August 1965, Raymond Joseph Gallagher was appointed as the next bishop. Bishop Gallagher not only attended the final sessions of the Second Vatican Council but made sure that new parishes were being erected where the growth of Catholic's were the greatest. Within the first five years of being Bishop, Gallagher dedicated many churches in northern Indiana. Bishop Gallagher was part of the Catholic Church during a time when social issues such as birth control were at their height.  In 1968 Pope Paul VI issued an encyclical letter forbidding artificial birth control. Throughout the reign, the Diocese grew, and Bishop Gallagher became very successful in his mission.

With Gallagher's retirement in 1982, Bishop George Avis Fulcher was appointed by Pope John Paul II. Within three weeks of his installation as Bishop, he was appointed to the US Bishops' Committee for the implementation of the Pastoral Letter on Peace. While driving to a conference on Canon Law in January 1984, Bishop Fulcher died when his car crashed off US-41 at Gobbler's Knob north of Rockville. With the sudden death, the diocese was left in shock and would not have another Bishop appointed until April of that year.

William Leo Higi was chosen by Pope John Paul II to succeed Fulcher and was installed on June 6, 1984.

New millennium and contemporary era
During Bishop Higi's reign, he not only expanded the Diocese by dedicating new churches, but also added the second high school to the diocese, St. Theodore Guerin High School in Noblesville. In addition to working within the diocese, he also made connections to Haiti with many outreaches to the third-world country. After over twenty-six years as head of the diocese, Bishop Higi retired in May 2010.

It was announced that Timothy Doherty would succeed Higi as the sixth bishop of the diocese. Bishop Doherty was consecrated bishop of the diocese on July 15, 2010, becoming the sixth and current bishop of the See of Lafayette.

As with many dioceses, the Diocese of Lafayette in Indiana has suffered from a shortage of priests. In 1990 there were 154 priests, while in 2010 it had dropped to 129. To help with the shortage, priests from Nigeria and Mexico have joined the diocese.

Bishops
  John George Bennett (1944–1957)
  John Joseph Carberry (1957–1965), appointed Bishop of Columbus and later Archbishop of Saint Louis (elevated to Cardinal in 1969)
  Raymond Joseph Gallagher (1965–1982)
  George Avis Fulcher (1983–1984)
  William Leo Higi (1984–2010)
  Timothy Doherty (2010–present)

Patron saint
See: Immaculate Conception
See: St. Mother Théodore Guérin
From its beginning in 1944, the patron of the Diocese of Lafayette in Indiana has been the Immaculate Conception because the seat of the diocese, The Cathedral of Saint Mary of the Immaculate Conception in Lafayette shares the namesake.  The feast day for the Immaculate Conception is on December 8.  It was in the early first decade of the 21st century that the diocese began contemplating adding another patron.  With the formation of St. Theodore Guerin High School in Noblesville in 2004, Guerin was officially named another patron of the Diocese of Lafayette.

Arms

Schools

Colleges
 Saint Joseph's College, Rensselaer in February 2017 the university's trustees announced the temporary closure of their Rensselaer campus at the end of the Spring 2017 semester. The trustees stated the university needs to raise $100 million in order to continue operations. The nursing campus in Lafayette remains open.

High schools

 Lafayette Central Catholic Jr/Sr High School, Lafayette
 St. Theodore Guerin High School, Noblesville

Media
Catholic radio within the diocese
 WRDF "Redeemer Radio" 106.3 FM licensed to Columbia City and based in Fort Wayne, plus audiostream.
 WSQM "Catholic Radio Indy" 90.9 FM in Noblesville.(repeater of WSPM 89.1 based in Indianapolis and licensed in Cloverdale), plus audiostream.

Publications
The Diocese of Lafayette publishes a weekly newspaper, The Catholic Moment, which was established on January 21, 1945. Its circulation is about 28,000.

Ecclesiastical province 
See: List of the Catholic bishops of the United States#Province of Indianapolis

Further reading

References

External links
Roman Catholic Diocese of Lafayette in Indiana Official Site

 
Roman Catholic Ecclesiastical Province of Indianapolis
Roman Catholic Dioceses in Indiana
History of Catholicism in Indiana
Lafayette in Indiana
Christian organizations established in 1944
1944 establishments in Indiana
Lafayette in Indiana